William Patrick Cronin (December 26, 1902 – October 26, 1966) was an American professional baseball player and manager. He played in Major League Baseball as a catcher for the Boston Braves between 1928 and 1931.

Biography
Nicknamed "Crungy", Cronin was born in the village of West Newton, Massachusetts, and played college baseball for Boston College. In 1923 and 1924, he played summer baseball for Falmouth of the Cape Cod Baseball League, batting .420 in 1923.

Cronin made his major league debut with the Braves in 1928. Over parts of four seasons with Boston, he collected 68 hits, including 15 doubles and two triples, in 126 games played. For most of the rest of that decade, Cronin toiled in the top-level Pacific Coast League. He became a player-manager in 1942, and skippered four minor league clubs over all or parts of four seasons. 

Cronin died in his home city of Newton at the age of 63.

References

External links

1902 births
1966 deaths
Baltimore Orioles (IL) players
Baseball players from Massachusetts
Binghamton Triplets managers
Binghamton Triplets players
Boston Braves players
Cape Cod Baseball League players (pre-modern era)
Dallas Rebels players
Falmouth Commodores players
Kansas City Blues (baseball) players
Leavenworth Braves players
Los Angeles Angels (minor league) players
Major League Baseball catchers
Montgomery Rebels players
Newark Bears (IL) players
Pittsfield Hillies players
Portland Beavers players
Providence Grays players
Providence Rubes players
Schenectady Blue Jays players
Sportspeople from Newton, Massachusetts
Syracuse Chiefs players
Worcester Panthers players